WOW Gospel 2014 is the seventeenth album in the WOW Gospel series. Motown Gospel, RCA Inspiration, Word Records, and Curb Records released the album on February 4, 2014. The album has sold 116,000 copies in the US as of February 2015.

Track listing

Charts

References

2014 compilation albums
Gospel compilation albums
WOW series albums
Christian music compilation albums